Aghazadeh Mansion and its windcatcher was built during the Qajar dynasty and is located in Abarkooh, Iran. This building is registered as a national historical monument in Iran and since 2015, the facade of this building has been portrayed on the 20,000 rial bills.

The windcatcher in this mansion is regarded as one of the finest examples of windcatchers in the world. The main windcatcher of this mansion is 18 meters high and covers an area of 18 square meters. There are 19 air-adjusting vents in the windcatcher, which are internally connected to the second windcatcher. This windcatcher can do the air-adjustment even if there is no wind blowing. Unlike most windcatchers, this one is a two-story structure.

The mansion features a cross-shaped northern room facing a central courtyard with a large stone pool in the middle. The mansion has three different sections, enabling residents to live in different parts of the house based on the weather conditions in various seasons.

The pergola in Aghazadeh Mansion has been decorated by muqarnas to let the light get in the building easily and make it look brighter.

References 

Houses in Iran
Buildings and structures in Yazd Province
Qajar architecture